There is a community of Russians in Serbia numbering 3,247 people (2011 census), which includes Serbian citizens of ethnic Russian descent or Russian-born people residing in the country.According to 2013 data there were 3,290 Russian citizens in Serbia.

History

Earlier smaller emigrations
While individual Russians emigrating to the territory of present-day Serbia was occurring since the Middle Ages, the first larger Russian emigrating population permanently residing on the territory of present-day Serbia were the Cossacks who settled on the territory of the Ottoman Empire at the beginning of the 18th century - the Nekrasovites on the territory of the Banat, which in 1779 became part of the Kingdom of Hungary (later Austria-Hungary).

Emigrations to Serbia increased shortly after the revival of Serbian statehood as part of the Ottoman Empire, after the Second Serbian Uprising (1815-1817), in the 1820s. According to the 1854 census of the Principality of Serbia, 998,919 people lived in the country, 12 of them were Russians. According to the 1884 census of the Kingdom of Serbia, 1,901,336 citizens lived in the country, 59 of whom were Russians.

First wave of emigration (spring 1919)

The mass resettlement of Russians in Serbia is associated with the October Revolution of 1917 and the subsequent Russian Civil War.

Leaving Odessa on April 3-6, the first major large group of refugees from Russia (about 1600 people) reached the Kingdom of Serbs, Croats and Slovenes in May 1919. Some emigrants moved to Serbia later, a few years later, after living in other European countries.

A significant part of the emigrants of the first wave later moved further to other European countries. According to Professor M. Jovanović, by the beginning of the 1920s, several hundred Russian settlers remained from the first wave in the Kingdom of Serbs, Croats and Slovenes.

Second wave of emigration (winter-spring 1920)
In January 1920, the authorities of the Kingdom of SHS agreed to receive a new group of migrants from Russia numbering 8,000 people . The first groups began to arrive at the end of January , the main part of the refugees reached Serbia in March-April, but during the summer of 1920 the influx of new groups of immigrants from Russia continued.

Third wave of emigration (November-December 1920)
The defeat of the White movement in Russia led to a mass exodus of opponents of the Bolsheviks from Soviet Russia. Kingdom of Serbs, Croats and Slovenes agreed to receive 20,000 Russian emigrants who reached the shores of the country in November-December 1920, a significant part of which arrived from Constantinople and the camp at Gallipoli.

Interwar period

In the future, separate groups of Russian refugees continued to move to the territory of Serbia (the term was understood as representatives of any ethnic group from the territory of Russia). For example, at the end of 1922, 983 disabled Russians were transported from the sanatoriums of Constantinople , and in February 1924, 367 students of the Khabarovsk Cadet Corps and 21 officers of the Far Eastern Army were received from Shanghai.

According to estimates, at the end of 1920, about 31,000 Russian emigrants lived in the Kingdom of SHS, at the end of 1921 - 42,500 refugees from Russia. In the second half of the 1920s, due to resettlement in other countries and natural decline (the death rate exceeded the birth rate), the number of Russian refugees decreased and stabilized in Yugoslavia at the level of 32-35 thousand people. More than 2/3 of them lived in Serbia.

Since 1921, an emigrant Russian church administration (later ROCOR) headed by Metropolitan of Kiev Anthony Khrapovitsky was located in the Serbian Sremski Karlovci (on 31 August, 1921, the Council of Bishops of the Serbian Church decided to grant administrative independent jurisdiction over the Russian emigre clergy to the Supreme Church Administration of Metropolitan Anthony Khrapovitsky outside the Kingdom of SHS, as well as the Russian clergy in the Kingdom of SHS, which is not in the public service or in the Serbian Church ). Until his death in 1936, Metropolitan Anthony Khrapovitsky was the de facto leader of all Russian refugees in Yugoslavia, also claiming to be the spiritual leader of the entire Russian diaspora. However, under his successor, Metropolitan Anastasius (who also lived until September 1944 in Sremski Karlovci), the real center of influence in ROCOR shifted from Karlovci to Berlin: from February 1938, the German authorities, who placed the ethnic German Bishop Seraphim at the head of the Berlin diocese Lyadeand provided significant material assistance to Russian parishes in Germany, began to demand the subordination of all Russian parishes in territories under German control to Bishop Seraphim.

World War II and Cold War
During the Second World War, the number of Russians in Serbia was about 20,000 people, most of whom were anti-communist and anti-Soviet.

In September 1941, at the initiative of Major General Mikhail Fedorovich Skorodumov, the German authorities allowed the creation of the Russian Protective Corps, in which at least 3 thousand Russian emigrants from Yugoslavia managed to serve during the war years (soon came under the command of General Boris Aleksandrovich Shteifon). Nevertheless, the overwhelming majority of the German occupation authorities were negative. After the liberation of Serbia in the autumn of 1944, the situation became dangerous for the Russian diaspora in Serbia - about a third of the most active and young Russian emigrants left the country, fleeing from SMERSH, and all Russian cultural and educational institutions were closed. After 1944, the Russian emigration in Serbia ceased to exist as a single socio-cultural organism. The gap between Tito and Stalin in 1948 finally finished off the Russian emigration in Yugoslavia (and hence in Serbia). It is noteworthy that the first harsh note of the Stalinist Foreign Ministry (not a party, but a state criticism of the USSR against Yugoslavia) was sent to Belgrade precisely in connection with violations of the rights and persecution of Russian emigrants.

In 1948-1953, Russian emigrants were fired from their jobs, detained and beaten by law enforcement agencies of Tito's Yugoslavia. As a result, a "second exodus" occurred, which finally changed the now biological fate of Russian emigrants. The rest lived in a dispersed state, they were afraid to maintain contact with each other, their children did not speak Russian for the most part, and in case of origin from mixed marriages, they tried not to declare themselves Russian. As a result, the process of assimilation has done its job - in modern Serbia, the descendants of Russian emigrants born after 1953, as a rule, do not speak Russian, and do not declare themselves Russian.

These persecutions ceased immediately after the elimination of political pressure from the Tito regime, which reconciled with the USSR after the death of Stalin. Since the 1960s, Russian wives of Serbian husbands began to actively arrive in Serbia, becoming the next, “Soviet” wave of emigration. Many of them managed to instill in their children national feelings and teach the Russian language. Their life in blooming Yugoslavia was not cloudless, the authorities made it difficult to obtain citizenship, were reluctant to nostrify diplomas, and there were problems with employment. At the same time, education in the national language in Serbia was impossible until the mid-1990s, when the school at the Russian Embassy in Serbia, which had existed since the 1970s, began to accept Serbian citizens for education. At the same time, in the 90s, a new wave of Russian emigrants "Russian" arrived in Serbia. Unlike the previous one, it (albeit in small numbers) was attended by men. Thus, Serbian citizens again began to be born in Serbia with Russian surnames, for whom Russian was the main language. The vast majority of the young generation of modern Russian-speaking citizens of Serbia are descendants of the "Soviet" and "Russian" waves of emigration.

Modern emigrations
In 2022, an estimated 30,000 to 50,000 Russians have moved to Serbia, many of them whose companies were hit with international sanctions. Initial waves consisted of mostly young Russians (with their families) that worked in IT, and have since reopened or registered their firms and companies in Serbia. Later larger waves occurred in the later half of the year after the announcement of the military drafts in Russia. The majority of Russians from this new emigration waves moved to Belgrade, with others moving to cities like Novi Sad and Subotica (mainly Vojvodina province).

As stated by the Ministry of Internal Affairs of Serbia, between February 24 and November 2, 2022, around 140,141 Russian citizens have registered residence in Serbia. These numbers include all temporary passing residence and registered emigrants, including statistics from required registration after 30 days of visa free residence. Because of this, actual number of residence with Russian citizenship is smaller from the statistical numbers given my the Ministry of Internal Affairs.

Demographics
The main center of modern residence of Russians in Serbia is Belgrade and its suburbs. The second major center of concentration of the Russian population is the city of Novi Sad in the South Bačka District of Vojvodina province. Due to the unstable situation in Kosovo and Metohija province, there are no data on the number of Russians in this region.

Notable people
 

Notable people of Russian descent that resided or currently reside on the territory of present-day Serbia

Middle Ages
Rostislav Mikhailovich, prince of Novgorod
Béla of Macsó, duke of Macsó

White émigré
Alexander Vasilievich Soloviev, jurist, slavist, and historian of Serbia and Serbian law
Aleksije Jelačić, historian
Aleksey Pavlovich Khrapovitsky, Metropolitan of Kiev and Galicia
Anatoli Ivanovich Rogozhin, Cossack officer
Grigorije Ivanovič Samojlov, architect, designer and painter
George Ostrogorsky, historian and Byzantinist who acquired worldwide reputations in Byzantine studies
Dmitry Pavlovich Kishensky, professor, doctor of medicine. In 1923 he emigrated to Prague.
Elizaveta Yurievna Kuzmina-Karavayeva, poetess, philosopher, publicist, public and religious figure. In 1923 she emigrated to Paris.
Nikolay Nikolayevich Afanasiev, Eastern Orthodox theologian
Nikolay Petrovich Krasnov, architect
Nina Kirsanova, ballet artist
Pyotr Nikolayevich Wrangel, general
Stepan Fedorovitch Kolesnikoff, realist painter
Vasily Vitalyevich Shulgin, politician, White émigré since 1944
Viktor Nikitin, pilot
Vladimir Ivanovich Strzhizhevsky, ace pilot
Yuri Lvovich Ionin, actor, theater director, teacher.

Other
Arkady Vyatchanin, swimmer, Russian-born
Dmitrij Gerasimenko, judoka, Russian-born
Đorđe Lobačev, comic strip author and illustrator
Đorđe Prudnikov, painter, graphic artist, and designer
Irina Antanasijević, philologist, Ukrainian-born
Leonid Šejka, painter and architect
Maria Manakova, chess player, Russian born
Nikolina and Olivera Moldovan, sprint canoers, Russian mother
Olja Ivanjicki, painter, sculptor, poet
Svetlana Prudnikova, chess player, Russian-born
Tamara Čurović, tennis player, Russian mother
Viktor Troicki, tennis player
Vladimir Volkov, football player

See also

Russia-Serbia relations
Serbs in Russia
White émigré
Church of the Holy Trinity, Belgrade
Russian Center of Science and Culture, Belgrade
Russian Protective Corps

References

Citations

Sources

 Mayevsky V. Russians in Yugoslavia. Relations between Russia and Serbia, New York, 1966, vol. 1-2.
 Tesemnikov V. A., "Russian emigration in Yugoslavia (1919-1945)", Questions of History 10/1982.
 Lobachev Y., "Kad se Volga uliva u Savu", Belgrade, 1997.
 Kosik V.I, Russian Church in Yugoslavia (20-40s of the XX century), Moscow, 2000.
 Tesemnikov V. A., Russian Belgrade, Moscow, 2008.
 Tanin S. Yu. Russian Belgrade. — M.: Veche, 2009. — 304 p. ISBN 978-5-9533-3609-3
 Timofeev A. Yu. Russian factor. World War II in Yugoslavia. — M.: Veche, 2010. — 400 p. ISBN 978-5-9533-4565-1
 Timofejev A., Rusi i Drugi svetski rat u Jugoslaviji: uticaj SSSR-а і ruskih emigranata na događаје u Jugoslaviji 1941—1945. Beograd, 2011
 Косик В. И., Что мне до вас, мостовые Белграда? Очерки о русской эмиграции в Белграде (1920—1950-е годы) — Москва., 2007.
 Timofeev A. Yu., Arsesniev A. B. et al. Russians in Serbia: Relations between Russia and Serbia from the end of the 12th to the beginning of the 21st century. Russian emigration in Serbia. Russians in Serbia - the last 60 years and today. - Belgrade, 2009. - 356 p. ISBN 978-86-88147-00-2
Raeff, M., 1990. Russia abroad: a cultural history of the Russian emigration, 1919-1939. Oxford University Press on Demand.

Russia–Serbia relations
Ethnic groups in Serbia
 
Russian diaspora in Serbia